Sari Kees (born 17 February 2001) is a Belgian footballer who plays as a defender for Belgian Women's Super League club Oud-Heverlee Leuven and the Belgium national team.

Club career
Kees started her youth career as a goalkeeper at SP Budingen. At age 10, she joined OH Leuven, and further developed as a central defender throughout their youth teams for the next eight seasons.

On 12 June 2019, it was announced that Kees joined Racing Genk for one season, becoming a team regular there.

Kees returned to OH Leuven again in April 2020, scoring the winning goal in their 1–0 win against defending champions Anderlecht. Leuven ended their season in second place, behind Anderlecht.

Kees stated that her ambitions for the coming years are becoming a full-time member of the national team, and earning a transfer to a foreign club.

International career
Kees is a member of the national team since the under-15s. As a central defender, she played for the under-19s in the UEFA U19 Championship in 2019 in their group matches against Spain, Germany and England.

Kees made her debut for the Belgium national team on 16 February 2022, in a 4–0 win against Slovakia in the Pinatar Cup in Spain.

Career statistics

International

International goals

References

External links 
 
 

2001 births
Living people
Belgian women's footballers
Women's association football defenders
Oud-Heverlee Leuven (women) players
KRC Genk Ladies players
Super League Vrouwenvoetbal players
Belgium women's youth international footballers
Belgium women's international footballers
UEFA Women's Euro 2022 players